Microtragus senex is a species of beetle in the family Cerambycidae. It was described by White in 1846. It is known from Australia.

References

Parmenini
Beetles described in 1846